The 1993 Fangoria Chainsaw Awards ceremony, presented by Fangoria magazine and Creation Entertainment, honored the best horror films of 1992 and took place on May 1, 1993, at the Sheraton Grand Los Angeles (711 S Hope St; formerly Hyatt Regency) in Los Angeles, California.

Awards

Fangoria Hall of Fame Award

Anthony Hopkins
Linnea Quigley

External links
1993 Fangoria Chainsaw Award Winners
1993 Fangoria Chainsaw Awards IMDb

Fangoria Chainsaw Awards
Fangoria Chainsaw Awards
Fangoria Chainsaw Awards
1993 in Los Angeles
1993 in American cinema